Thành hoàng (Chữ Hán: 城隍) or Thần hoàng (神隍), Thần Thành hoàng (神城隍) refers to the gods that is enshrined in each village's communal temple in Vietnam. The gods is believed to guard the village against disasters and bring it fortune.

Etymology

 is a Sino-Vietnamese word, literally referring to the city wall and the moat that surrounds it. It is also the Vietnamese pronunciation of Chinese Chénghuáng (or City God), which was adopted from Taoism.

Origin

No later than Đinh dynasty, each locality started to worship the mountain and river gods that ruled over a domain which encompassed their village. Later on, the government decreed the deification of late national heroes, righteous officials and loyal subjects, and specific localities were chosen to exalt these gods. Gradually other common folks took up the practice and worshipped their own gods to be blessed with protection and fortune.

Ranking

Generally each village worships only one Thành Hoàng; however, it is not rare to see two or more gods enshrined simultaneously at a village. They are known collectively as Gods of Fortune (Phúc Thần).

Even these Gods were divided in three ranks
 High ranking gods: famous mountain and river gods, immortals such as Thánh Gióng, Chử Đồng Tử whose backgrounds are mysterious and miraculous, and unusually brilliant men such as Lý Thường Kiệt and Trần Hưng Đạo.
 Middle ranking gods: whose accomplishments are ambiguous but have been worshiped for a long time
 Lower ranking gods: whose background and accomplishments are ambiguous but are known to bless mortals

Apart from the ranked gods acknowledged by the government, there were villages that worshiped "demons" and "tainted gods" such as the Beggar God, the Serpent God, the God of Lecherousness, and others.

Notes

See also
 Cheng Huang Gong
 Tu Di Gong
 Seonangsin
 Dōsojin

References
Phan Kế Bính, Vietnamese Customs, Ho Chi Minh City Publishing house, 1990 edition.

Vietnamese folk religion
Vietnamese mythology
Tutelary deities
Vietnamese deities
Vietnamese gods